The Chesapeake and Albemarle Railroad  is a short-line railroad that operates  of track from Chesapeake, Virginia to Edenton, North Carolina.

The railroad was originally part of the Norfolk Southern Railroad, which continued south, crossing the Albemarle Sound and on to Mackeys Ferry and Plymouth. The current railroad began operations in 1990, was acquired by RailAmerica in 2000, and subsequently acquired by the Genesee & Wyoming. With the acquisition of the railroad by Genesee & Wyoming, the railroad made the decision to lower track speeds from 25-35mph to 10-25mph.

C&A interchanges with both Norfolk Southern Railway, CSX Transportation, and the Norfolk and Portsmouth Belt Line Railroad.

The railroad's traffic comes mainly from stone and chemical products along with smaller amounts of potash lumber and cement.  The CA hauled around 3,300 carloads in 2008.

2158's last run
On July 15, 2022 C&A EMD GP7U 2158 made its last run. The train was led by C&A 3557 which was 2158's replacement as well as Ex GC 2116 for power. 3557 lead most of the trip, until the vulcan stone yard where 3557 was put onto a siding and 2158 took the lead for a bit. It had moved across the road and blew its RS3K horn for the last time in its 70 year service. Some time later, the C&A crew took 2158 to its final resting spot with C&A 75 as well as C&A 1720. As of October 31, 2022, those engines are on the siding in Elizabeth City having their number boards scrapped,  horns removed, and control panels disconnected. The locomotives are now rusting away. C&A has begun scrapping the locomotives because parts are unavailable due to the age of the equipment. 2158 has always been a part of history in the C&A Railroad because it was the only surviving Heritage Unit on the line.

See also

Thoroughbred Shortline Program

References

External links

Chesapeake and Albemarle Railroad official webpage - Genesee & Wyoming website
American Short Line & Regional Railroad Association: CA

North Carolina railroads
Virginia railroads
RailAmerica
Spin-offs of the Norfolk Southern Railway